A WAG bag is a plastic bag used to carry human feces out of a wilderness area. WAG is an acronym that stands for Waste Aggregation and Gelling. 

Typically, human feces can be buried in the backcountry. However, in certain places, such as popular hiking areas or in winter, human waste can accumulate and therefore WAG bags are used to carry out the feces to dispose of later. WAG Bags can be a simple plastic bag, or can more often include a litter box type of filler to absorb fluids and help biodegrade anything inside.

Use of a WAG bag is a part of the Leave No Trace etiquette.

Examples of use
WAG bags are legally required on the Mount Whitney Trail because it sees so much use. Rock climbers use WAG bags when sleeping in a portaledge.

See also
 Flying toilet
 Pooper-scooper

References

Sanitation
Waste collection
Camping equipment